Cereblon is a protein that in humans is encoded by the CRBN gene. The gene that encodes the cereblon protein is found on the human chromosome 3, on the short arm at position p26.3  from base pair 3,190,676 to base pair 3,221,394. CRBN orthologs are highly conserved from plants to humans.

Function

Ubiquitination and role in development 

Cereblon forms an E3 ubiquitin ligase complex with damaged DNA binding protein 1 (DDB1), Cullin-4A (CUL4A), and regulator of cullins 1 (ROC1).  This complex ubiquitinates a number of other proteins.  Through a mechanism which has not been completely elucidated, this ubiquitination results in reduced levels of fibroblast growth factor 8 (FGF8) and fibroblast growth factor 10 (FGF10). FGF8 in turn regulates a number of developmental processes, such as limb and auditory vesicle formation. The net result is that this ubiquitin ligase complex is important for limb outgrowth in embryos.

In the absence of cereblon, DDB1 forms a complex with DDB2 that functions as a DNA damage-binding protein.  Furthermore, cereblon and DDB2 bind to DDB1 in a competitive manner.

Regulation of potassium channels 

Cereblon binds to the large-conductance calcium-activated potassium channel (KCNMA1) and regulates its activity.  Moreover, mice lacking this channel develop neurological disorders.

Clinical significance

Birth defects 

The drug thalidomide binds to cereblon and changes which substrates can be degraded by it, which leads to an antiproliferative effect on myeloma cells and possibly the teratogenic effect on fetal development. Thalidomide was used as a treatment for morning sickness from 1957 until 1961 but was withdrawn from the market after it was discovered that it caused birth defects.  It is estimated that 10,000 to 20,000 children were affected.  However, the idea that cereblon modulation is responsible for the teratogenic activity of thalidomide in the chick and zebrafish was cast into doubt due to a 2013 report that pomalidomide (a more potent thalidomide analog) does not cause teratogenic effects in these same model systems even though it binds with cereblon more strongly than thalidomide.

Intellectual disability

Mutations in the CRBN gene are associated with autosomal recessive nonsyndromic intellectual disability, possibly as a result of dysregulation of calcium-activated potassium channels in the brain (see below) during development.

References

Further reading

External links